Following is the list of cultural heritage sites in Gilgit-Baltistan, Pakistan. According to the Pakistan Environmental Protection Agency publication on protected areas, there are only two notified archaeological sites and monuments in Gilgit-Baltistan.

|}

References

Buildings and structures in Gilgit-Baltistan
Archaeological sites in Pakistan
Cultural heritage sites in Gilgit-Baltistan